Trung Dũng is a ward located in Biên Hòa city of Đồng Nai province, Vietnam. It has an area of about 0.8km2 and the population in 2018 was 31,861.

Biên Hòa station located in Trung Dũng ward.

References

Bien Hoa